Christian Spencer Jessen (born 4 March 1977) is a British celebrity doctor, television personality, and writer. He is best known for appearing in the Channel 4 programmes Embarrassing Bodies (2007–2015) and Supersize vs Superskinny (2008–2014).

Education
Jessen was educated at Uppingham School, a co-educational independent school situated in the small market town of Uppingham in Rutland, followed by University College London and the London School of Hygiene & Tropical Medicine, both constituent colleges of the University of London in Central London, where he received his MBBS degrees in 2001.

Career
Jessen studied medicine as an undergraduate at University College London, graduating in 2001. He holds a MSc degree in sexual health, and has a particular interest in HIV and malaria, which were the focus of his work in Kenya and Uganda. An advocate for HIV education and testing, in 2015, he was named National HIV Testing Week Ambassador.

Television
From 2007 to 2015, Jessen co-presented Embarrassing Bodies alongside Pixie McKenna and Dawn Harper. The show has had a number of spin-off series including Embarrassing Teenage Bodies, Embarrassing Bodies: Kids and Embarrassing Fat Bodies.

Another spin off was set in Australia in 2013 called Embarrassing Bodies Down Under, which Jessen co-hosted with Brad McKay, Ginni Mansberg, and Sam Hay.

He presented Channel 4's Supersize vs Superskinny series from 2008 until 2014.

In 2012, Jessen appeared as the health and fitness expert in Hotel GB. He was the winner of popular culinary show Ready Steady Cook and has appeared as a celebrity contestant on The Weakest Link. He was also the winner of the BBC show Antiques Master.

He was Jack Osbourne's doctor during the filming of Finding God, and also featured in Harley Street, a documentary. Other television appearances include Sex in Court and The Wright Stuff.

In 2012 and 2014, he co-presented the Stand Up to Cancer telethon alongside Davina McCall and Alan Carr.

In 2014, he produced and starred in a documentary series for television called Undercover Doctor: Cure Me I’m Gay. In the series, Jessen investigates therapies purported to be "cures" for homosexuality.

In an appearance on Loose Women, Jessen performed a live HIV test on a woman and drew criticism for not wearing protective gloves. Jessen defended his actions and called for more understanding on how HIV spreads.

In 2018, he co-starred and produced a documentary series for UKTV Play called Dr Christian: 12 hours to cure your Street, in which he travelled across the UK in a mobile clinic to treat individuals in their hometowns.

Writing
He is the author of Can I Just Ask? (2010). He has also written three books for adolescents: Dr Christian's Guide to Growing Up (2013), Dr Christian's Guide to Dealing with the Tricky Stuff (2015) and Dr Christian's Guide to You (2016).

Controversies

BBC Panorama investigation

In August 2018, a BBC Panorama documentary investigation revealed Jessen's involvement in a private online pharmacy, UK Meds. Such sites are believed to allow people to purchase potentially dangerous prescriptions with ease and cannot be regulated by the Care Quality Commission due to a loophole allowing them to issue prescriptions via third party doctors in Romania. The owner of the pharmacy, Mason Soiza, has previously faced accusations of running escort agencies and WordPress plugin scams.

COVID pandemic

During the COVID-19 pandemic, Jessen sparked criticism for comments, saying that Italian COVID-19 countermeasures were an "excuse for a long siesta". He also commented on the severity of the pandemic, regarding it only as a case of bad cold and scaremongering by the media.

Arlene Foster

In 2020, the First Minister of Northern Ireland Arlene Foster launched legal action against Jessen for defamation over a tweet in December 2019 that falsely claimed she had been having an extra-marital affair. The tweet was not deleted until two weeks after it was posted. In court, Foster alleged that the tweet was posted at a time when some anonymous Twitter accounts were claiming she was having an affair with one of her security guards. It was further alleged that Jessen had been contacted 13 times by email and letter about it but had not answered. In May 2021, Mr Justice McAlinden awarded Foster £125,000 in damages and full costs after Jessen lost the case, describing his conduct as "an outrageously bad libel". The judge added that Jessen's failure to apologise for or to retract the libel were aggravating features.

Personal life
Jessen is gay and his partner, Rogério Barreto, is Brazilian. His father is from Germany.

He is an atheist, a humanist, and a patron of Humanists UK, a charity that advocates for secularism, equalities, and human rights. He has stated that he has muscle dysmorphia.

He endorsed Boris Johnson during the 2019 Conservative Party leadership election.

Filmography
Television

Guest appearances

8 Out of 10 Cats (2010, 2011, 2014)
The Alan Titchmarsh Show (2010, 2011)
Would I Lie to You? (2012)
Celebrity Juice (2012, 2013, 2015)
Sunday Brunch (2012, 2013, 2014)
Alan Carr: Chatty Man (2012, 2014)
Alan Carr's Summertime Specstacular (2012)
The Million Pound Drop (2012)
The Sarah Millican Television Programme (2013)
Let's Do Lunch with Gino & Mel (2013)
Celebrity Fifteen to One (2014)
Weekend (2014)
Sweat the Small Stuff (2014)
Mel & Sue (2015)
Room 101 (2015)
The Saturday Show (2015)
The Chase: Celebrity Special (2015)

References

External links
Official website

1977 births
21st-century British medical doctors
Alumni of University College London
Alumni of the UCL Medical School
Channel 4 people
British people of German descent
British television personalities
British television presenters
Gay men
British LGBT broadcasters
English LGBT people
LGBT physicians
English atheists
English humanists
Living people
People educated at Uppingham School
People from Hammersmith
21st-century LGBT people